Il piccolo Archimede (internationally released as The Little Archimedes) is a 1979 Italian comedy-drama film written and directed by Gianni Amelio. It  is an adaptation of Aldous Huxley's short story "The Young Archimedes" (1924). For her role Laura Betti was awarded as best actress at the San Sebastián International Film Festival.

Cast 
Laura Betti: Miss Bondi 
Shirley Corrigan: Elisabeth 
Mark Morganti: Robin 
John Steiner: Alfred

References

External links

1979 films
Films based on works by Aldous Huxley
Films directed by Gianni Amelio
1979 comedy-drama films
1979 comedy films
1979 drama films
Italian comedy-drama films
1970s Italian films